The women's snowboard cross competition of the 2018 Winter Olympics was held on 16 February 2018 Bogwang Phoenix Park in Pyeongchang, South Korea. The event was won by Michela Moioli. Julia Pereira de Sousa Mabileau became second, and Eva Samková, the defending champion, third.

In the finals, Lindsey Jacobellis lead from the start, but was passed first by Moioli, and then by Pereira de Sousa Mabileau. Before the final jump, she was fifth, also behind Samková and Chloé Trespeuch, the 2014 bronze medalist. In this jump, Trespeuch fell and crossed the finish line on her back; this allowed Jacobellis to finish fourth, 0.03 seconds behind Samková. Trespeuch, despite her fall, was fifth, and the last finalist, Aleksandra Zhekova, sixth. Jacobellis was consistently rated favorite in this Olympic event since 2006 and only won a medal once, silver in 2006.

In the victory ceremony, the medals were presented by Bernard Rajzman, member of the Executive Board of the International Olympic Committee, accompanied by Michel Vion, FIS Council Member.

Qualification

The top 24 athletes in the Olympic quota allocation list qualified, with a maximum of four athletes per National Olympic Committee (NOC) allowed. All athletes qualifying must also have placed in the top 30 of a FIS World Cup event or the FIS Freestyle Ski and Snowboarding World Championships 2017 during the qualification period (1 July 2016 to 21 January 2018) and also have a minimum of 100 FIS points to compete. If the host country, did not qualify, their chosen athlete would displace the last qualified athlete, granted all qualification criterion was met.

Results

Qualification
The qualification run was held at 10:00.

 She suffered an accident and was injured in a training session on February 15.

Elimination round
In the quarterfinals the first three ranked competitors in each heat proceed to the next phase. In the semifinals the first three ranked competitors of each heat proceed to the Big Final. The 4th to 6th ranked competitors of each heat proceed to the Small Final.

Quarterfinals

Heat 1

Heat 2

Heat 3

Heat 4

Semifinals

Heat 1

Heat 2

Finals
Small Final

Large Final

References

Women's snowboarding at the 2018 Winter Olympics